Vilém Tauský CBE (20 July 1910, Přerov, Moravia – 16 March 2004, London) was a Czech conductor and composer who, from the advent of the Second World War, lived and worked in the UK, one of a significant group of émigré composers and musicians who settled there.

Life
Vilém Tauský was from a  musical family: his Viennese mother had sung Mozart at the Vienna State Opera under Gustav Mahler, and her cousin was the operetta composer Leo Fall.

Tauský studied with Leoš Janáček and later became a repetiteur at the Brno Opera.  His other teachers included Vilém Petrzelka (composition) and Zdeněk Chalabala (conducting).  At the age  of nineteen he conducted Puccini's Turandot in Brno on short notice in place of Chalabala, who had become ill.  Tauský was of Jewish ancestry, and the rise of the Nazis forced him to move to France.  He later volunteered for service with the Free Czech Army.  He eventually reached the UK in 1940 after the fall of France, arriving with other soldiers on a Yugoslav coal ship to Newport, Monmouthshire.

He served musical functions in the Czechoslovak Army in exile, as a military band conductor in France.  Bohuslav Martinů composed his Field Mass for Tauský and his regimental band, but the fall of France prevented them from giving the premiere.  He continued as a band and choir leader in the UK.

During the Coventry Blitz on the night of 14 November 1940, Tausky was based ten miles away in Leamington Spa with the Czech Free Army. His unit was mobilized to search the ruins for survivors. He wrote his Coventry Meditation for strings to commemorate the civilian casualties and the destruction of the  Cathedral. The work was first performed by the Menges Quartet on 17 March 1942 at a Myra Hess National Gallery Concert in London. The piece was revived in November 2021 by the Jubilee Quartet in Leamington. During the conflict he was awarded a Czech Military Cross, followed by the Czech Order of Merit at the end of the war.

Opera
From 1945 to 1949, Tauský was musical director of the Carl Rosa Opera Company, and following several years conducting regional BBC orchestras in Belfast, Glasgow and Manchester he was appointed music director of Welsh National Opera (1951-1956). He made his Covent Garden début with The Queen of Spades in January, 1951. On 26 December 1953 he became possibly the only conductor to conduct two operas on the same day, with a performance of Humperdinck's Hansel and Gretel in the afternoon at Sadler's Wells and Giuseppe Verdi's Il trovatore at Covent Garden in the evening. He was artistic director of the Phoenix Opera touring company from 1966 to 1975.

Tauský introduced many Czech operas to the UK, including Smetana's The Kiss in 1948,  Janáček's Osud in 1972 and Smetana's The Brandenburgers in Bohemia in 1994. In 1955 he also conducted all six symphonies by his friend Martinu in London, marking the composer's 65th birthday. He also conducted many premieres of UK operas including A Dinner Engagement and Nelson (Lennox Berkeley, both 1954), The Violins Of St Jacques (Malcolm Williamson, 1966) and a studio recording of Miss Julie (William Alwyn, 1977). In total Tauský was responsible for twenty-six British opera and operetta premières.

Light music
Tauský was the first foreign conductor to conduct the Band of the Coldstream Guards in 100 years and was an instructor/adjudicator at Kneller Hall for some years, as well as an adjudicator at the annual Brass Band competitions. He was principal conductor of the BBC Concert Orchestra from 1956 to 1966. He regularly appeared with this orchestra on the BBC Light Programme's long-running weekly show Friday Night is Music Night. Between 1966 and 1992, he was the director of opera and head of the conducting course at the Guildhall School of Music and Drama. As a composer, his most popular success was the Harmonica Concertino he wrote for Tommy Reilly in 1973, which was also used for a ballet in New York.

Andrew Lamb points out that, following his ten years with the BBC Concert Orchestra during which he raised its profile and range considerably, he was forever after branded as a light music specialist. He "never regained the profile he had previously enjoyed in more serious music, for which he was eminently qualified".

In 1979, Tauský published  his memoirs under the title Vilém Tauský Tells his Story, which his wife Peggy Mallett co-authored.  That same year, he was honoured as a Freeman of the City of London.  In 1981, he was appointed a Commander of the Order of the British Empire (CBE).  He and Mallett published the book Leoš Janáček: Leaves from his Life in 1982. Tauský and Mallett were married from 1948 until her death in 1982. He was the stepfather of her two sons, who both died before her. He is survived by his companion of his later years, Brenda Rayson.

Selected works
 1925 - Cello Sonata No 1
 1930 - Symfonieta for orchestra
 1930 - Three Songs for soprano & piano
 1932-8 - Three operettas (for Brno Opera House): Marcella, Keep Smiling, Little Girl in Blue
 1934 - Christopher Columbus, play with music
 1935 -The Lost World, music for documentary film
 1939 - Variations for Piano on an Original Theme
 1940 - Two Military Marches: The Czechs are Marching, Call to Arms
 1941 - Coventry: A Meditation for String Quartet 
 1942 - Variations on a Welsh Tune, piano
 1943 - Interim Balance, music for documentary film
 1945 - Rhapsody on Tunes by Smetana for piano & orchestra
 1950 - Concert Overture for Brass Band
 1957 - Fantasia da Burlesca for violin & orchestra
 1964 - Cello Sonata No 2
 1965 - Essay for solo viola
 1965 - String Quartet
 1973 - Concertino for Harmonica, Strings, Harp & Percussion (written for Tommy Reilly)
 1975 - Ballade for cello and piano
 1978 - From Our Village, three movement suite for orchestra
 1980 - Suite for Violin & Piano
 1998 - Serenade for Strings

See also 
 List of émigré composers in Britain

References

External links
 BBC Concert Orchestra history page
 Coventry: A Meditation for String Quartet, performed by Ensemble Modern
 Vilem Tausky by Derek Allen (1952), National Portrait Gallery

1910 births
2004 deaths
20th-century classical composers
Commanders of the Order of the British Empire
Czech classical composers
Czech male classical composers
Czech conductors (music)
Male conductors (music)
Musicians from Přerov
Pupils of Leoš Janáček
20th-century conductors (music)
20th-century Czech male musicians
Czechoslovak emigrants to the United Kingdom
BBC Orchestras